Kristinn Geir Friðriksson (born 8 July 1988) is an Icelandic former basketball player and coach. He is currently a basketball analyst for Domino's Körfuboltakvöld (English: Domino's Basketball Night) on Stöð 2 Sport.

Club career
Kristinn played 17 seasons in the Icelandic top-tier Úrvalsdeild karla. His best season as a player came in 1994-1995 when he finished as the league's third leading scorer, averaging 27.1 points per game for Þór Akureyri, and was selected to the Úrvalsdeild Domestic All-First Team. He was selected to the 1995 Icelandic All-Star game where he scored 51 points.

On 2 May 2001, Kristinn received a one-month suspension from the National Olympic and Sports Association of Iceland after he tested positive for efedrin.

National team career
Between 1992 and 1994, Kristinn played 13 games for the Icelandic national basketball team.

Titles and awards

As player

Titles
4x Icelandic League champion (1989, 1992, 1993, 1997)
2x Icelandic Cup winner (1993, 1997)
2x Icelandic Company Cup winner (1996, 1999)
 Icelandic Division I champion (2006)

Awards
 Úrvalsdeild Domestic All-First Team (1995)

As coach

Titles
Icelandic Division I champion (2006)

References

External links
Úrvalsdeild statistics at kki.is
Eurobasket.com Profile

1971 births
Living people
Kristinn Fridriksson
Kristinn Fridriksson
Kristinn Fridriksson
Kristinn Fridriksson
Kristinn Fridriksson
Kristinn Fridriksson
Shooting guards
Kristinn Fridriksson
Kristinn Fridriksson
Kristinn Fridriksson
Kristinn Fridriksson
Kristinn Fridriksson
Kristinn Fridriksson